Ohtani Dam  is a gravity dam located in Kumamoto Prefecture in Japan. The dam is used for irrigation. The catchment area of the dam is 53.4 km2. The dam impounds about 18  ha of land when full and can store 2021 thousand cubic meters of water. The construction of the dam was completed in 1940.

See also
List of dams in Japan

References

Dams in Kumamoto Prefecture